Antimicrobial Agents and Chemotherapy is a peer-reviewed scientific journal published by the American Society for Microbiology. It covers antimicrobial, antiviral, antifungal, and antiparasitic agents and chemotherapy. The editor-in-chief is Cesar A. Arias (University of Texas Health Science Center at Houston). It was established in 1972 by Gladys Lounsbury Hobby.


Abstracting and indexing 
The journal is abstracted and indexed in:

According to the Journal Citation Reports, its 2021 impact factor is 5.938, ranking it 51st out of 279 journals in the category Pharmacology & Pharmacy and 35th out of 137 journals in the category Microbiology.

References

External links 
 

Delayed open access journals
Publications established in 1972
Pharmacology journals
Microbiology journals
English-language journals
Academic journals published by learned and professional societies
Monthly journals
American Society for Microbiology academic journals